is a Japanese wrestler. He competed in the men's Greco-Roman 62 kg at the 1984 Summer Olympics.

References

External links
 

1953 births
Living people
Japanese male sport wrestlers
Olympic wrestlers of Japan
Wrestlers at the 1984 Summer Olympics
Place of birth missing (living people)
Asian Games gold medalists for Japan
Asian Games medalists in wrestling
Wrestlers at the 1986 Asian Games
Medalists at the 1986 Asian Games
20th-century Japanese people
21st-century Japanese people